William Stanley Jr. (November 28, 1858 – May 14, 1916) was an American physicist born in Brooklyn, New York. During his career, he obtained 129 patents covering a variety of electric devices. In 1913, he also patented an all-steel vacuum bottle, and formed the Stanley Bottle Company.

Early life
Stanley was born November 28, 1858 in Brooklyn, New York, the son of William Stanley and Elizabeth A. Parsons Stanley. William Jr. attended Williston Seminary and later graduated from Yale University with the class of 1881.

Career
Stanley was as an electrician working with tele keys and fire alarms of an early manufacturer. In Philadelphia, Stanley designed one of the first electrical installations (at a Fifth Avenue store). Shortly thereafter, George Westinghouse hired Stanley as his chief engineer at his Pittsburgh factory.

In 1885, Stanley built the first practical alternating current transformer based on Lucien Gaulard and John Dixon Gibbs' prototype of 1881. This device was the precursor to the modern transformer. In December, under a new contract with Westinghouse, Stanley moved his operations to Great Barrington, Massachusetts.

In 1886, on March 20, Stanley demonstrated the first complete system of high voltage Alternating Current transmission, consisting of generators, transformers and high-voltage transmission lines. His system allowed the distribution of electrical power over wide areas.  He used the system to light offices and stores along the main street of Great Barrington - the location of his West Avenue family home. Stanley's transformer design became a prototype for future transformers, and his AC distribution system formed the basis of modern electrical power distribution. His work in the electrification of Great Barrington's Main Street was named an IEEE Milestone.

Agreeing that the AC system had arrived, Westinghouse further tested the system in summer 1886 in Pittsburgh; it transmitted over a distance of 3 miles, and used an alternator designed by Stanley to replace the Siemens model, which regulated voltage poorly. Satisfied with the pilot system, Westinghouse began commercial production and shipped his company's first commercial to Buffalo, New York, where a local utility placed it in service.  Orders for 25 alternating-current plants followed within months.

In 1890, Stanley founded the Stanley Electric Manufacturing Company in Pittsfield, Massachusetts. In 1903 the General Electric Corporation purchased a controlling interest in the firm.  The land on which the company once stood is now the site of the William Stanley Business Park of the Berkshires in Pittsfield.

Patents

William Stanley Jr. was granted 129 patents for a range of products and electrical devices. A selection of patents follow. Significant patents are in bold.

 , Circuit-closer for incandescent lamps
 , Electric lamp
 , Filament for incandescent electric lamps
 , Multiple incandescent electric lamp
 , Carbon for incandescent lamps
 , Socket for incandescent electric lamp
 , Holder for incandescent electric lamp
 , Globe for incandescent electric lamp
 , Induction coil
 , Automatic cut-out for electric-lighting circuits
 , Automatic cut-out for electric-lighting circuit
 , Incandescent electric lamp
 , System of electric lighting

Personal life
William married to Lila Courtney (Wetmore) Stanley in 1884. In 1935, their son, Harold Stanley, went on to found the modern day financial firm of Morgan Stanley with J. P. Morgan's grandson, Henry Sturgis Morgan.

William Stanley Jr. died at his home in Great Barrington on May 14, 1916.

See also
Oliver B. Shallenberger

References

Further reading
 "William Stanley" (Nov.22, 1858-May 14, 1916), Dictionary of American Biography, Vol XVII, Charles Scribner's Sons, New York, 1935, p. 514.
 "William Stanley", The National Cyclopedia of American Biography, Vol XXIV, James T. White & Co., New York, 1935, p. 394.
 William Stanley (1858–1916) – His Life and Work, Laurence A. Hawkins, The Newcomen Society in North America, New York, 1951.

External links
 Alternating Current Development in America by William Stanley
 William Stanley Lighted a Town and Powered an Industry by Bernard A. Drew and Gerard Chapman
 William Stanley Jr. - Pioneer of the transformer and alternating current (AC) distribution
 ejcov, William Stanley Jr.
 Early History of the A-C System in America
 IEEE Legacies William Stanley Jr.
 , 1908. P. 348
  AboutInventors; William Stanley
  How Stanley's design formed the basis of modern Transformers

1858 births
1916 deaths
People from Brooklyn
Williston Northampton School alumni
Yale University alumni
American electrical engineers
American physicists
IEEE Edison Medal recipients
Engineers from New York City
Scientists from New York (state)